Timothy Kevin Story (born March 13, 1970) is an American film director. He is best known for Barbershop (2002), the Fantastic Four (2005) and the Ride Along franchise.  He has been nominated for two NAACP Image Awards for Outstanding Directing in a Feature Film/Television Movie in 2006 and 2013.

He is the founder of The Story Company, an entertainment production company that he started with his future wife in 1996.

Early life
Born in Los Angeles on March 13, 1970, Story attended LA's Westchester High School, with jazz pianist Eric Reed and actresses Regina King and Nia Long. He was senior class president at Westchester High. He graduated from the USC School of Cinematic Arts in 1991.

While in high school, Story briefly attempted a career in music. He was part of Ice-T's Rhyme Syndicate and even appeared as a member of the group T.D.F. on the song "T.D.F. Connection" from the 1988 compilation album Rhyme Syndicate Comin' Through. A group member was shot and killed prior to them being signed to Warner Bros. Records. Story later turned his attention to directing feature films.

Filmography
Film

Stand-up film
 Kevin Hart: Laugh at My Pain (2011)
 Kevin Hart: Let Me Explain (2013)
 Kevin Hart: What Now? (2016)

Television

Music videos
"I Can't Feel It (Remix)" by Ghetto Mafia (1997)
"I Do" by Jon B. (1998)
"Cool Relax" by Jon B. (1998)
"Sweet Lady" by Tyrese (1998)
"Are U Still Down" by Jon B. feat. 2Pac (1998)
"Cheers 2 U" by Playa (1998)
"He Can't Love U" by Jagged Edge (1999)
"Get Gone" by Ideal (1999)
"Creep Inn" by Ideal (1999)
"I Drive Myself Crazy" by 'N Sync (1999)
"Tell Me It's Real" by K-Ci & JoJo (1999)
"Lately" by Tyrese (1999)
"It Feels So Good" by Sonique (2000)
"My First Love" by Avant feat. Keke Wyatt (2000)
"Ryde Or Die Chick" by The LOX feat. Eve and Timbaland (2000)
"Mr. Too Damn Good" by Gerald Levert (2000)
"Wild Out" by The LOX (2000)
"Let's Get Married" by Jagged Edge (2000)
"Why You Wanna Keep Me From My Baby" by Guy (2000)
"Brown Skin" by India.Arie (2001)
”Nasty Girl” by Queens cast: Brandy, Eve, Naturi Naughton and Nadine Velasquez (2021)

Collaborations

References

External links

1970 births
African-American film directors
Comedy film directors
Film producers from California
American music video directors
Living people
USC School of Cinematic Arts alumni
Film directors from Los Angeles
21st-century African-American people
20th-century African-American people